Angola competed at the 2012 Summer Paralympics in London, United Kingdom from August 29 to September 9, 2012.

Medallists

Athletics 
Jose Sayovo Armando won a gold medal for Angola in the Men's 400m T11 event on September 7.
Men's Track and Road Events

Women's Track and Road Events

See also

 Angola at the 2012 Summer Olympics

References

Nations at the 2012 Summer Paralympics
2012
2012 in Angolan sport